Abraxas latifasciata is a species of moth belonging to the family Geometridae. It was described by Warren in 1894. It is known from south-eastern Siberia, eastern China and Japan.

The wingspan is 30–39 mm.

References

Abraxini
Moths of Asia
Moths described in 1894